Guinard may refer to:

 Girard I of Roussillon, count of Roussillon from 1102 to 1113
 Manuel Guinard (born 1995), French tennis player